Henri Rheinwald (24 July 1884 – 24 April 1968) was a Swiss racing cyclist. He was the Swiss National Road Race champion in 1908, 1912 and 1919.

References

External links
 

1884 births
1968 deaths
Swiss male cyclists
People from Le Locle
Sportspeople from the canton of Neuchâtel